Seyed Mohammad-Amin Shaikholislami Mukri, better known by his pen name Hemin Mukriyani or Hêmin Mukriyānī (1921–1986) was a Kurdish poet, journalist, translator, and literary critic.

He was born in the village of Lachin, near Mahabad in 1921.  After going through the elementary school of Saadat in Mahabad and completing his religious training at the Shaikh Borhan's Khanaqah in the village of Sharafkand, Hemin joined the Kurdish Resurrection Party (Komeley Jiyanewey Kurd), founded in 1942. This was the first Kurdish political organization with a clear ambition for the establishment of an independent Greater Kurdistan.  During the World War II when the Red Army invaded parts of northern Iran, including most of Azarbaijan and parts of Kurdistan, KJK changed its name to Kurdish Democratic Party and declared the first Kurdish republic with Mahabad as its capital.  Mukriyani, along with his best friend Abd-al-Rahman Sharafkandi (Hazhar), was named the Kurdish national poet of the Republic of Mahabad, and became the secretary of Haji Baba Shaikh, the prime minister and head of the self-proclaimed Republic. He fled the oppression that followed the downfall of the Republic in December 1946 and he took refuge in Slêmanî in Southern Kurdistan, where he was arrested. He was released after a while. After the agreements of 11 March 1970, which allowed the Kurdish insurgents and Baghdad's central government a four years' respite, Hemin settled down in Baghdad and became an active member of the Kurdish Academy of Science.

Works
He contributed regularly to the newspapers Kurdistan, Hawari Kurd (The call of the Kurds), Hawarî nîştiman (The call of the motherland), Girugalî mindalan (The children's babble), Agir (Fire), Halala (Tulip), the organ of the Kurdish Women's Association. After the fall of the Pahlavi monarchy in 1979 in Iran, he set up the Salaha-al-Din Ayyubi Kurdish publishing house in Urmia, which publishes a Kurdish journal called Sirwe (Breeze), from spring 1985. Mukriyani served as the editor of the journal until his death in 1986.

Books
 Tarîk û Rûn, Collection of Poems, 1974.
 Naley Judaî, Collections of Poems, 1979.
 Paşerokî Mamosta Hêmin, A collection of articles, Mahabad, 1983.

References
Hemin in Encyclopaedia Iranica
Hesami, Karim, Yad-e Hemin, Sweden, 1987.

1921 births
1986 deaths
People from Mahabad
Kurdish-language poets
Kurdish poets
Kurdish scholars
20th-century poets
20th-century Iranian poets